Electric Lake is a large reservoir on Huntington Creek high on the east slope of the Wasatch Plateau in Utah. The reservoir was created in 1974 by the construction of an earth-fill dam. The shoreline is primarily owned by Utah Power and Light (UP&L) and the Huntington-Cleveland Irrigation Company. Access is limited but the northern end of the reservoir is adjacent to the national forest and access is unrestricted at that point.

Uses
Water is consumed for irrigation and power plant cooling, but also used for recreation and coldwater aquatic habitat. Enough water is stored to provide cooling water for a four-year drought, so water levels remain deep throughout most summers. This greatly enhances recreational use. Electric Lake is accessible from U-31 and U-264. U-31 follows the south shore for about 0.5 miles near the dam (21 miles east of Fairview City and 27 miles northwest of Huntington), but there is no boat ramp at this access. U-264 follows the north shore for 1/2 mile (6 miles east of junction U-31 and 9 miles west of junction U-96). There are latrines and a concrete boat ramp at this site. Both highways are maintained year-round, making the area popular for winter recreation.

References

Reservoirs in Utah
Lakes of Emery County, Utah